The Northern Sierra Madre Natural Park is the largest protected area of the Philippines covering the northern range of the Sierra Madre mountains of eastern Luzon. It was first declared a wilderness reserve encompassing an area within a   radius of Palanan Point known as the Palanan Wilderness Area through Letter of Instructions No. 917-A signed by President Ferdinand Marcos on September 7, 1979. On March 10, 1997, the area was converted into a natural park with the signing of Proclamation No. 978 by President Fidel Ramos.

The park is considered the richest in terms of genetic, species and habitat diversity in the Philippines. It is one of the country's ten priority protected areas managed by its own Protected Area Management Board headed by the Regional Executive Director of the Department of Environment and Natural Resources for Region II under the rules set forth in Article III of Republic Act 9125, also known as the Northern Sierra Madre Natural Park (NSMNP) Act of 2001. In 2006, the protected area was added to the Philippines' tentative list of potential UNESCO World Heritage Sites.

Geography

The Northern Sierra Madre Natural Park lies in the midsection of the Sierra Madre mountain range which stretches from the province of Aurora to Cagayan. It is bounded on the north by the Dikatayan River, on the south by the Disabungan River, on the west by Cagayan Valley, and on the east by the Philippine Sea.

The park is characterized by high mountains with very steep slopes in the central portion of the range and relatively low hills with dominantly moderate steep slopes towards the coast. The second highest is Mount Divilacan with an elevation of  located on its eastern flank.

Northern Sierra Madre is drained by 14 major river systems, 11 of which empty into the Philippine Sea and 3 flow into the Rio Grande de Cagayan as tributaries of the Ilagan River.

Biodiversity

The Northern Sierra Madre Natural Park is within the Sierra Madre Biogeographic Zone which lies along the eastern side of Central Luzon. It is considered as one of the most important protected areas system in the Philippines owing to the myriad of rare and endangered species of flora and fauna that it supports. They include the Philippine eagle, giant golden-crowned flying fox, Philippine eagle-owl, Isabela oriole, green sea turtle, loggerhead sea turtle, hawksbill sea turtle, Philippine crocodile and dugong. It is also home to the green-faced parrotfinch and the Northern Sierra Madre forest monitor.

The park is also a habitat to many endemic species of plants. It spans two ecoregions. The Luzon rain forests extend from sea level up to 1000 meters elevation, and are characterized by various species of tall, straight and slender trees of the family Dipterocarpaceae such as Shorea spp. and Hopea spp.. The Luzon montane rain forests include areas above 1000 meters elevation, and the predominant trees are oaks and laurels. The park is home to various orchids such as Dendrobium aclinia, the leguminous plant millettia, and species of citrus (Aurantioideae).

Woodlands cover the largest portion of the park followed by agricultural lands and grasslands. In the coastal municipalities of Palanan and Maconacon where agricultural lands are mostly found, the most common crops are palay, coconut, corn, peanuts, pineapple and other vegetable crops. Grasslands and shrublands are found mainly in the park's southwestern portion where cogon grass and talahib grow.

See also
 Fuyot Springs National Park

References

Natural parks of the Philippines
Protected areas of the Sierra Madre (Philippines)
Geography of Isabela (province)
Protected areas established in 1979
1979 establishments in the Philippines
World Heritage Tentative List for the Philippines